James Arnold Arneson (born January 7, 1951) is a former American football offensive lineman in the National Football League (NFL) for the Dallas Cowboys and Washington Redskins. He played college football at the University of Arizona and was drafted in the twelfth round of the 1973 NFL Draft.

Early years
Arneson attended Palo Verde High School in Tucson, Arizona, where he was named honorable-mention All-City in 1968.

He accepted a football scholarship from the University of Arizona where he played with his brother Mark Arneson. He began his college career as an offensive tackle before being switched to offensive guard. He received All-WAC honors as a senior.

Professional career

Dallas Cowboys
Arneson was selected by the Dallas Cowboys in the twelfth round (307th overall) of the 1973 NFL Draft. As a rookie, he played mainly on special teams.

In 1974, he appeared in all 14 games, seeing action at guard, center and special teams. He was blocking at guard during the winning drive of Clint Longley come from behind 24-23 victory against the Washington Redskins on Thanksgiving.

In his time with the team he was a backup at the center and guard positions. On September 2, 1975, he was traded to the Cleveland Browns in exchange for a draft choice (not exercised).

Cleveland Browns
In 1975, he was released by the Cleveland Browns before playing in a game.

Washington Redskins
On October 31, 1975, he was signed as a free agent by the Washington Redskins. He was released on Sep 4, 1976.

Personal life
After football he worked in building and land development projects. His brother Mark Arneson played linebacker in the NFL for the St. Louis Cardinals.

References

External links
 

1951 births
Living people
Players of American football from Tucson, Arizona
American football offensive linemen
Arizona Wildcats football players
Dallas Cowboys players
Washington Redskins players